The Enchantress is a 1924 German silent drama film directed by William Karfiol and starring Olga Tschechowa, Charlotte Ander, and Hans Mierendorff.

The film's sets were designed by the art director .

Cast

References

Bibliography

External links

1924 films
Films of the Weimar Republic
Films directed by William Karfiol
German silent feature films
German black-and-white films
Films based on German novels
Films based on works by Ludwig Ganghofer
German drama films
1924 drama films
Silent drama films
1920s German films
1920s German-language films